Sorites is a peer-reviewed academic journal covering analytic philosophy. It is indexed by The Philosopher's Index.

Analytic philosophy
Philosophy journals
English-language journals
Publications established in 1995